The 2012 Newcastle City Council election took place on 3 May 2012 to elect members of Newcastle City Council in North East England. This was on the same day as other 2012 United Kingdom local elections.

Ward by Ward Results
Spoilt votes not included below.

Benwell & Scotswood ward

Blakelaw ward

Byker ward

Castle ward

Dene ward

Denton ward

East Gosforth ward

Elswick ward

Fawdon ward

Fenham ward

Kenton ward

Lemington ward

Newburn ward

North Heaton ward

North Jesmond ward

Ouseburn ward

Parklands ward

South Heaton ward

South Jesmond ward

Walker ward

Walkergate ward

West Gosforth ward

Westerthorpe ward
In 2008, Marc Donnelly stood in this ward as the Liberal Democrat candidate. The change in percentage here for him is relative to then.

Westgate ward

Wingrove ward

Woolsington ward

References

2012 English local elections
2012
21st century in Newcastle upon Tyne